The 1986 New York Mets season was the Mets' 25th season in the National League. They improved from a 98–64 record in 1985 to finish the season with a franchise record 108–54 record, giving them the division title. They went on to defeat the Houston Astros in six games in the NLCS and the American League champion Boston Red Sox in seven games in the World Series. This is their last championship to date.

The 1986 Mets are one of just three National League teams (the other two are the 1975 Cincinnati Reds and the 2022 Los Angeles Dodgers) to have won twice as many games as lost in the regular season since 1909. The team is often regarded as one of the best of all-time, being cited in 2021 by ESPN as a top contender for best MLB team of the previous half-century from 1970 to 2020.

Background
Darryl Strawberry and Ron Darling made their debuts in 1983, followed by Dwight Gooden and Sid Fernandez in 1984, and Lenny Dykstra and Roger McDowell in 1985. The Mets hired Davey Johnson to manage the ballclub in 1984, resulting in a solid season with 90 victories and a second-place finish. The rise continued in 1985, as they netted 98 wins and finished the season only 3 games behind the St. Louis Cardinals.

In the 1985–86 offseason, general manager Frank Cashen brought in Tim Teufel, a right-handed hitting infielder from the Minnesota Twins and Bob Ojeda, a left-handed pitcher from the Boston Red Sox.  The Mets added them to an existing veteran core including along with former MVPs George Foster and Keith Hernandez, veteran catcher Gary Carter and speedsters Wally Backman and Mookie Wilson.

With these acquisitions, many predicted an easy dominance within the division. The pundits were right. During spring training, Davey Johnson said to his players that they were not only going to win, but that they would dominate.  That meant winning the division by double digits. The Mets concluded the season winning a club-record 108 games, two out of every three, and finishing the season  games in front of the Philadelphia Phillies.

Offseason
 November 13, 1985: Calvin Schiraldi, Wes Gardner, John Christensen, and La Schelle Tarver were traded by the Mets to the Boston Red Sox for Bob Ojeda, Tom McCarthy, John Mitchell and Chris Bayer (minors).
 November 13, 1985: Kelvin Chapman was released by the New York Mets.
 December 10, 1985: Clint Hurdle was drafted from the Mets by the St. Louis Cardinals in the 1985 rule 5 draft.
January 16, 1986: Ronn Reynolds was traded by the New York Mets with Jeff Bittiger to the Philadelphia Phillies for Rodger Cole and Ronnie Gideon.
 January 16, 1986: Billy Beane, Joe Klink, and Bill Latham were traded by the Mets to the Minnesota Twins for Tim Teufel and Pat Crosby (minors).
 March 4, 1986: Tim Corcoran was signed as a free agent by the Mets.

Spring training
The 1986 New York Mets held spring training at Al Lang Stadium in St. Petersburg, Florida for the 25th season.

Regular season

Season standings

Record vs. opponents

Notable transactions
 April 1, 1986: Tom Gorman was released by the Mets.
 April 5, 1986: Doug Frobel was traded by the Montreal Expos to the New York Mets for Joe Graves (minors) and Rodger Cole (minors).
 June 2, 1986: 1986 Major League Baseball draft
Curtis Pride was drafted by the Mets in the 10th round. Player signed June 12, 1986.
John Olerud was drafted by the Mets in the 27th round of the 1986 amateur draft, but did not sign.
 June 9, 1986: Tim Corcoran was released by the Mets.
 August 3, 1986: Lee Mazzilli was signed as a free agent by the Mets.
 August 7, 1986: George Foster was released by the Mets.
 August 24, 1986: Alex Diaz was signed as an amateur free agent by the Mets.

Month by month

April
The Mets had a rocky start with a 2–3 record (including two extra-inning losses to the St. Louis Cardinals and Philadelphia Phillies respectively). But when the Mets hosted Philadelphia at Shea Stadium a few days later, they kicked off an 11-game winning streak. Their toughest test in this stretch happened in St. Louis. On April 24, Howard Johnson hit a game-tying homer. A few games later, Wally Backman made a series-saving double-play. The Mets finished the month 13–3.

May
The Mets went 18–9 in May and ended the month with a season record of 31–12.

June
On June 10 against the Phillies, Tim Teufel hit a pinch-hit, game-winning grand slam. The Mets went 19–9 during June and finished the month with a season record of 50–21.

July
On July 3 against Houston, Darryl Strawberry hit a game-tying home run. But it was Ray Knight who won the game with a homer of his own, after striking out in his first four at-bats. Dwight Gooden's first half performance was good enough for him to earn the honor of being named starting pitcher for the National League in the All-Star Game in the Astrodome. This game marked the end of a streak where the NL won 13 of the previous 14 games and served as foreshadowing for what would happen next. Later in the month, the Mets lost three of four to the Astros. During this series, four Mets were arrested at a popular nightclub in Houston. Their fortunes improved in a bizarre game in Cincinnati's Riverfront Stadium on July 22. In the top of the ninth, Dave Parker dropped the ball that could have been the final out for the Reds, allowing the Mets to tie the game. In the bottom of the tenth, Eric Davis got to third and brawled with Ray Knight. Both men, along with Kevin Mitchell and Mario Soto, were ejected. Johnson was forced to alternate Jesse Orosco and Roger McDowell in the outfield. In the bottom of the twelfth, Carl Willis bunted into a double-play. In the top of the fourteenth, Howard Johnson hit a home run to put the Mets on top. The Mets went 16–11 during July and finished the month with a season record of 66–32 and were up by 15.5 games in the NL East division.

August
Former MVP George Foster was released. Former Mets favorite Lee Mazzilli returned. Gary Carter was injured. While he was gone, the Mets won 8 of 11 games. The Mets went 21–11 in August and ended with a season record, to that point, of 87–43 and were up by 19 games in the NL East division.

September–October
When they got to Philadelphia, droves of Mets fans were there to see if they would clinch the NL East. In fact, they seemed to take up half of Veterans Stadium. Given what had happened to them when they got swept in a three-game series by the Cubs in Philadelphia preceding the series and not wanting to see visiting teams win a division title on their field, the Phillies swept the Mets. During the series, Mets fans at Veterans Stadium became unruly and damaged seats in the upper deck (the 700 level). One Mets fan was arrested after striking at two Philadelphia police officers. The Phillie Phanatic summed up the Mets being swept by crushing three Mets helmets in front of the Mets dugout during the final game of the series. The Phillies ended up being the only team in the league to post a winning record against the Mets, going 10–8, with a 7–2 mark at Veterans Stadium. During the postseason awards, the Mets rivalry with the Phillies and that series was played out again, as it was Mike Schmidt of the Phillies who won the National League MVP Award, ahead of Gary Carter, who finished third, and Keith Hernandez, who finished fourth. It was Schmidt's third career MVP.

The Mets then split a two-game series in St. Louis, trimming the magic number to clinch to 1 on September 16. The following day, they faced Dennis Eckersley and the Chicago Cubs. With a flu-ridden Hernandez, Dave Magadan was the offensive source of the day. Hernandez returned in the 9th to get the final out. The champagne was popped immediately while the fans invaded the field quickly. The Mets won a team-record 108 games after defeating the Pirates.

The Mets went 21–11 during the final two months to end the season with a record of 108-54 while winning the NL East division by 21.5 games.

Schedule and results

Regular season

|-  style="text-align:center; background:#bfb;"
| 1 || April 8 || @ Pirates|| 4–2 || Gooden (1–0) || Reuschel (0–1) || || 48,962 || Three Rivers Stadium || 1–0 || Boxscore || 1 || Tied || 6:05 PM EST || WOR-TV || || ||
|-  style="text-align:center; background:#bbb;"
| || April 10 || @ Pirates || colspan=5|Postponed (inclement weather); rescheduled for June 6 || Three Rivers Stadium || || || || bgcolor="ffbbbb" | -½ || || || || ||
|-  style="text-align:center; background:#bfb;"
| 2 || April 11 || @ Phillies|| 9–7 || Ojeda (1–0) || Gross (0–1) || Orosco (1) || 36,190 || Veterans Stadium || 2–0 || Boxscore || 2 || -½ || 7:35 PM EST || || SportsChannel New York Plus || ||
|-  style="text-align:center; background:#fbb;"
| 3 || April 12 || @ Phillies|| 8–9 (14) || Hudson (1–0) || Niemann (0–1) || || 22,737 || Veterans Stadium || 2–1 || Boxscore || 2 || - || 1:20 PM EST || || || NBC ||
|-  style="text-align:center; background:#fbb;"
| 4 || April 13 || @ Phillies|| 2–4 || Rawley (1–0) || Aguilera (0–1) || || 27,691 || Veterans Stadium || 2–2 || Boxscore || 3 || - || 3:05 PM EST || WOR-TV || || ABC ||
|-  style="text-align:center; background:#fbb;"
| 5 || April 14 || Cardinals|| 2–6 (13) || Perry (1–0) || Niemann (0–2) || || 47,752 || Shea Stadium || 2–3 || Boxscore || 4 || - || 1:35 PM EST || WOR-TV || || ||
|-  style="text-align:center; background:#bbb;"
| || April 16 || Cardinals || colspan=5|Postponed (rain); rescheduled for August 14 || Shea Stadium || || || || bgcolor="ffbbbb" | - || || || || ||
|-  style="text-align:center; background:#bbb;"
| || April 17 || Cardinals || colspan=5|Postponed (rain); rescheduled for August 17 || Shea Stadium || || || || bgcolor="ffbbbb" | - || || || || ||
|-  style="text-align:center; background:#bfb;"
| 6 || April 18 || Phillies|| 5–2 || Darling (1–0) || Carlton (0–2) || Orosco (2) || 26,906 || Shea Stadium || 3–3 ||  Boxscore || 3 || - || 7:35 PM EST || WOR-TV || || ||
|-  style="text-align:center; background:#bfb;"
| 7 || April 19 || Phillies|| 3–2 || Gooden (2–0) || Rawley (1–1) || || 38,333 || Shea Stadium || 4–3 ||  Boxscore || 3 || - || 1:35 PM EST || || SportsChannel New York || ||
|-  style="text-align:center; background:#bfb;"
| 8 || April 20 || Phillies|| 8–0 || Fernandez (1–0) || Gross (0–2) || || 41,848 || Shea Stadium || 5–3 ||  Boxscore || 3 || - || 1:35 PM EST || WOR-TV || || ||
|-  style="text-align:center; background:#bfb;"
| 9 || April 21 || Pirates || 6–5 || McDowell (1–0) || Clements (0–1) || || 10,282 || Shea Stadium || 6–3 ||  Boxscore || 2 || -1 || 7:35 PM EST || WOR-TV || || ||
|-  style="text-align:center; background:#bfb;"
| 10 || April 22 || Pirates || 7–1 || Ojeda (2–0) || Kipper (0–1) || || 15,668 || Shea Stadium || 7–3 ||  Boxscore || 1 || Tied || 7:35 PM EST || || SportsChannel New York Plus || ||
|-  style="text-align:center; background:#bfb;"
| 11 || April 24 || @ Cardinals || 5–4 (10) || McDowell (2–0) || Worrell (0–1) || || 33,597 || Busch Memorial Stadium || 8–3 || Boxscore || 1 || + || 8:35 PM EST || || SportsChannel New York Plus || ||
|-  style="text-align:center; background:#bfb;"
| 12 || April 25 || @ Cardinals || 9–0 || Gooden (3–0) || Horton (0–2) || || 43,721 || Busch Memorial Stadium || 9–3 || Boxscore || 1 || + || 8:35 PM EST || WOR-TV || || ||
|-  style="text-align:center; background:#bfb;"
| 13 || April 26 || @ Cardinals || 4–3 || Fernandez (2–0) || Cox (0–1) || Orosco (3) || 44,769 || Busch Memorial Stadium || 10–3 || Boxscore || 1 || + || 1:20 PM EST || || || NBC ||
|-  style="text-align:center; background:#bfb;"
| 14 || April 27 || @ Cardinals || 5–3 || Ojeda (3–0) || Tudor (3–1) || || 39,193 || Busch Memorial Stadium || 11–3 || Boxscore || 1 || +4 || 3:05 PM EDT || WOR-TV|| || ABC ||
|-  style="text-align:center; background:#bfb;"
| 15 || April 29 || @ Braves || 10–5 || Berenyi (1–0) || McMurtry (0–1) || McDowell (1) || 12,258 || Atlanta–Fulton County Stadium || 12–3 || Boxscore || 1 || + || 5:40 PM EDT || || SportsChannel New York || ||
|-  style="text-align:center; background:#bfb;"
| 16 || April 30 || @ Braves || 8–1 || Gooden (4–0)|| Johnson (3–1) || || 23,361 || Atlanta–Fulton County Stadium || 13–3 || Boxscore || 1 || +5 || 7:40 PM EDT || || SportsChannel New York Plus || ||
|-

|-  style="text-align:center; background:#fbb;"
| 17 || May 1 || @ Braves || 2–7 || Smith (2–2)  || Aguilera (0–2) || || 8,343 || Atlanta–Fulton County Stadium ||13–4|| Boxscore || 1 || + || 5:40 PM EDT || || SportsChannel New York || ||
|-  style="text-align:center; background:#bfb;"
| 18 || May 2 || @ Reds || 8–7 || Fernandez (3–0)  || Gullickson (0–3) || Orosco (4) || 20,677 || Riverfront Stadium ||14–4|| Boxscore || 1 || + || 7:35 PM EDT || WOR-TV || || ||
|-  style="text-align:center; background:#bfb;"
| 19 || May 3 || @ Reds || 4–1 || Ojeda (4–0)  || Denny (1–3) || Orosco (5) || 20,268 || Riverfront Stadium ||15–4|| Boxscore || 1 || + || 2:15 PM EDT || || SportsChannel New York Plus || ||
|-  style="text-align:center; background:#bfb;"
| 20 || May 4 || @ Reds || 7–2 || Darling (2–0)  || Soto (2–3) || McDowell (2) || 25,407 || Riverfront Stadium ||16–4|| Boxscore || 1 || + || 2:15 PM EDT || WOR-TV || || ||
|-  style="text-align:center; background:#bfb;"
| 21 || May 6 || Astros || 4–0 || Gooden (5–0)  || Knepper (5–1) || || 41,722 || Shea Stadium ||17–4|| Boxscore || 1 || +5 || 7:35 PM EDT || || SportsChannel New York || ||
|-  style="text-align:center; background:#bfb;"
| 22 || May 7 || Astros || 3–2 || Fernandez (4–0)  || Ryan (3–4) || Orosco (6) || 26,956 || Shea Stadium ||18–4|| Boxscore || 1 || +5 || 7:35 PM EDT || || SportsChannel New York || ||
|-  style="text-align:center; background:#bfb;"
| 23 || May 9 || Reds  || 2–1 || Ojeda (5–0)  || Soto (2–4) || 'McDowell (3) || 40,744 || Shea Stadium ||19–4|| Boxscore || 1 || +5 || 7:35 PM EDT || WOR-TV || || ||
|-  style="text-align:center; background:#bfb;"
| 24 || May 10 || Reds  || 5–1 || Darling (3–0)  || Browning (0–4) || || 45,303 || Shea Stadium ||20–4|| Boxscore || 1 || +5 || 1:20 PM EDT || || || NBC ||
|-  style="text-align:center; background:#fbb;"
| 25 || May 11 || Reds  || 2–3 || Gullickson (2–3)  || Gooden (5–1) || Franco (4) || 44,236 || Shea Stadium ||20–5|| Boxscore || 1 || +4 || 1:35 PM EDT || WOR-TV || || ||
|-  style="text-align:center; background:#bfb;"
| 26 || May 12 || Braves  || 1–0 || McDowell (3–0)  || Assenmacher (1–1) || Shea Stadium || 45,303 || Shea Stadium ||21–5|| Boxscore || 1 || +5 || 7:35 PM EDT || || SportsChannel New York || ||
|-  style="text-align:center; background:#fbb;"
| 27 || May 13 || Braves  || 3–6 || Johnson (4–3)  || Aguilera (0–3) || Sutter (2) || 29,052 || Shea Stadium ||21–6|| Boxscore || 1 || +4 || 7:35 PM EDT || || SportsChannel New York || ||
|-  style="text-align:center; background:#fbb;"
| 28 || May 14 || @ Astros  || 2–6 || Knepper (7–1)  || Ojeda (5–1) || || 11,626 || Astrodome ||21–7|| Boxscore || 1 || +3 || 8:35 PM EDT || WOR-TV || || ||
|-  style="text-align:center; background:#bfb;"
| 29 || May 15 || @ Astros  || 6–2 || Darling (4–0) || Ryan (3–5) || || 13,856 || Astrodome ||22–7|| Boxscore || 1 || +4 || 8:35 PM EDT || WOR-TV || || ||
|-  style="text-align:center; background:#fbb;"
| 30 || May 16 || @ Dodgers  || 3–4 (11) || Howell (1–2)  || Orosco (0–1) || || 11,626 || Dodger Stadium ||22–8|| Boxscore || 1 || +3 || 10:35 PM EDT || WOR-TV || || ||
|-  style="text-align:center; background:#fbb;"
| 31 || May 17 || @ Dodgers  || 2–6 || Niedenfuer (2–2)  || Fernandez (4–1) || || 39,429 || Dodger Stadium ||22–9|| Boxscore || 1 || +3 || 4:05 PM EDT || || || NBC ||
|-  style="text-align:center; background:#bfb;"
| 32 || May 18 || @ Dodgers  || 8–4 || Niemann (1–2)  || Reuss (2–2) || || 44,426 || Dodger Stadium ||23–9|| Boxscore || 1 || +3 || 3:05 PM EDT || WOR-TV|| || ABC ||
|-  style="text-align:center; background:#bfb;"
| 33 || May 20 || @ Giants  || 2–1 || Ojeda (6–1)  || LaCoss (4–1) || McDowell (4) || 28,837 || Candlestick Park ||24–9|| Boxscore || 1 || +4 || 10:35 PM EDT || || SportsChannel New York || ||
|-  style="text-align:center; background:#bfb;"
| 34 || May 21 || @ Giants  || 7–4 || Darling (5–0)  || Mason (2–4) || || 18,618 || Candlestick Park ||25–9|| Boxscore || 1 || +5 || 3:05 PM EDT || || SportsChannel New York || ||
|-  style="text-align:center; background:#fbb;"
| 35 || May 22 || @ Giants  || 2–10 || Krukow (6–3) || Gooden (5–2) || || 27,442 || Candlestick Park ||25–10|| Boxscore || 1 || +4 || 4:05 PM EDT || || SportsChannel New York || ||
|-  style="text-align:center; background:#fbb;"
| 36 || May 23 || @ Padres  || 4–7 || Gossage (3–3) || Orosco (0–2) || || 22,982 || Jack Murphy Stadium ||25–11|| Boxscore || 1 || +3 || 10:05 PM EDT || WOR-TV || || ||
|-  style="text-align:center; background:#bfb;"
| 37 || May 24 || @ Padres  || 5–4 || Berenyi (2–0) || Thurmond (2–4) || Orosco (7) || 36,679 || Jack Murphy Stadium ||26–11|| Boxscore || 1 || +3 || 10:05 PM EDT || || SportsChannel New York || ||
|-  style="text-align:center; background:#bfb;"
| 38 || May 25 || @ Padres  || 4–2 (11) || Orosco (1–2) || Lefferts (3–2) || || 30,296 || Jack Murphy Stadium ||27–11|| Boxscore || 1 || +4 || 4:05 PM EDT || WOR-TV || || ||
|-  style="text-align:center; background:#bfb;"
| 39 || May 27 || Dodgers  || 8–1 || Darling (6–0) || Welch (3–4) || || 35,643 || Shea Stadium ||28–11|| Boxscore || 1 || + || 7:35 PM EDT || WOR-TV || || ||
|-  style="text-align:center; background:#bfb;"
| 40 || May 28 || Dodgers  || 4–2 || Gooden (6–2) || Reuss (2–4) || || 41,032 || Shea Stadium ||29–11|| Boxscore || 1 || + || 7:35 PM EDT || WOR-TV || || ||
|-  style="text-align:center; background:#bfb;"
| 41 || May 29 || Dodgers  || 5–2 || Fernandez (5–1) || Valenzuela (7–3) || Orosco (8) || 41,080 || Shea Stadium ||30–11|| Boxscore || 1 || +6 || 7:35 PM EDT || || SportsChannel New York || ||
|-  style="text-align:center; background:#bfb;"
| 42 || May 30 || Giants || 8–7 (10) || Orosco (2–2) || Davis (1–3) ||  || 38,243 || Shea Stadium ||31–11|| Boxscore || 1 || +6 || 7:35 PM EDT || WOR-TV || || ||
|-  style="text-align:center; background:#fbb;"
| 43 || May 31 || Giants || 3–7 || Garrelts (5–5) || Ojeda (6–2) || || 50,498 || Shea Stadium ||31–12|| Boxscore || 1 || +6 || 7:05 PM EDT || || SportsChannel New York || ||
|-

|-  style="text-align:center; background:#fbb;"
| 44 || June 1 || Giants || 3–7 || Krukow (7–3) || Darling (6–1) || || 49,041 || Shea Stadium ||31–13|| Boxscore || 1 || +6 || 3:05 PM EDT || WOR-TV|| || ABC ||
|-  style="text-align:center; background:#bfb;"
| 45 || June 2 || Padres || 11–2 || Gooden (7–2) || Hoyt (2–2) || || 28,426 || Shea Stadium ||32–13|| Boxscore || 1 || + || 7:35 PM EDT || || SportsChannel New York || ||
|-  style="text-align:center; background:#fbb;"
| 46 || June 3 || Padres || 4–5 || Hawkins (4–4) || Fernandez (5–2) || Gossage (9) || 25,196 || Shea Stadium ||32–14|| Boxscore || 1 || + || 7:35 PM EDT || WOR-TV || || ||
|-  style="text-align:center; background:#bfb;"
| 47 || June 4 || Padres || 4–2 || McDowell (4–0) || Walter (1–1) || || 26,735 || Shea Stadium ||33–14|| Boxscore || 1 || + || 7:35 PM EDT || WOR-TV || || ||
|-  style="text-align:center; background:#bfb;"
| 48 || June 5 || @ Pirates || 7–0 || Ojeda (7–2) || Kipper (1–5) || || 8,855 || Three Rivers Stadium ||34–14|| Boxscore || 1 || + || 7:35 PM EDT || || SportsChannel New York || ||
|-  style="text-align:center; background:#fbb;"
| 49 || June 6 || @ Pirates || 1–7 || Rhoden (5–3) || Darling (6–2) || Walk (2) || N/A || Three Rivers Stadium ||34–15|| Boxscore || 1 || +8 || 5:35 PM EDT || WOR-TV || || ||
|-  style="text-align:center; background:#bfb;"
| 50 || June 6 || @ Pirates || 10–4 || McDowell (5–0) || León (1–3) || || 15,113 || Three Rivers Stadium ||35–15|| Boxscore || 1 || +8 || 8:57 PM EDT || WOR-TV || || ||
|-  style="text-align:center; background:#bfb;"
| 51 || June 7 || @ Pirates || 6–4 || Gooden (8–2) || Reuschel (4–5) || Orosco (9) || 29,770 || Three Rivers Stadium ||36–15|| Boxscore || 1 || +9 || 7:05 PM EDT || || SportsChannel New York || ||
|-  style="text-align:center; background:#bfb;"
| 52 || June 8 || @ Pirates || 4–3 || Fernandez (6–2) || McWilliams (1–4) || Orosco (10) || 14,391 || Three Rivers Stadium ||37–15|| Boxscore || 1 || +9 || 1:35 PM EDT || WOR-TV || || ||
|-  style="text-align:center; background:#fbb;"
| 53 || June 9 || Phillies || 2–3  (10) || Carman (3–0) || Sisk (0–1) || Bedrosian (8) || 26,050 || Shea Stadium ||37–16|| Boxscore || 1 || +8 || 7:35 PM EDT || || SportsChannel New York || ||
|-  style="text-align:center; background:#bfb;"
| 54 || June 10 || Phillies || 8–4  (11) || McDowell (6–0) || Lerch (0–1) || || 27,472 || Shea Stadium ||38–16|| Boxscore || 1 || +8 || 7:35 PM EDT || WOR-TV || || ||
|-  style="text-align:center; background:#bfb;"
| 55 || June 11 || Phillies || 5–3 || Darling (7–2) || Carlton (4–7) || Orosco (11) || 27,830 || Shea Stadium ||39–16|| Boxscore || 1 || +8 || 7:35 PM EDT || WOR-TV || || ||
|-  style="text-align:center; background:#bfb;"
| 56 || June 13 || Pirates || 6–5 || Orosco (3–2) || Clements (0–2) ||  || 37,582 || Shea Stadium ||40–16|| Boxscore || 1 || +9 || 7:35 PM EDT || WOR-TV || || ||
|-  style="text-align:center; background:#bfb;"
| 57 || June 14 || Pirates || 5–1 || Fernandez (7–2) || Bielecki (4–4) ||  || 47,664 || Shea Stadium ||41–16|| Boxscore || 1 || +10 || 1:35 PM EDT || || SportsChannel New York || ||
|-  style="text-align:center; background:#bfb;"
| 58 || June 15 || Pirates || 4–1 || Ojeda (8–2) || Walk (2–3) ||  || N/A || Shea Stadium ||42–16|| Boxscore || 1 || + || 1:05 PM EDT || WOR-TV || || ||
|-  style="text-align:center; background:#bfb;"
| 59 || June 15 || Pirates || 8–5 || Aguilera (1–3) || Kipper (2–6) || McDowell (5)  || 41,847 || Shea Stadium ||43–16|| Boxscore || 1 || + || 4:08 PM EDT || WOR-TV || || ||
|-  style="text-align:center; background:#bfb;"
| 60 || June 16 || @ Expos || 4–1 (10)|| Sisk (1–1) || Reardon (6–4) || || 16,347 || Olympic Stadium ||44–16|| Boxscore || 1 || + || 7:35 PM EDT || || SportsChannel New York || ||
|-  style="text-align:center; background:#fbb;"
| 61 || June 17 || @ Expos || 2–4 || Hesketh (4–4) || Berenyi (2–1) || Burke (4) || 20,193 || Olympic Stadium ||44–17|| Boxscore || 1 || + || 7:35 PM EDT || WOR-TV || || ||
|-  style="text-align:center; background:#fbb;"
| 62 || June 18 || @ Expos || 4–7 || Youmans (6–5) || Gooden (8–3) || Reardon (16) || 22,026 || Olympic Stadium ||44–18|| Boxscore || 1 || + || 7:35 PM EDT || WOR-TV || || ||
|-  style="text-align:center; background:#bbb;"
| || June 19 || Cubs || colspan=5|Postponed (rain); rescheduled for July 29 || Shea Stadium || || || || bgcolor="bbffbb" | +10 || || || || ||
|-  style="text-align:center; background:#bfb;"
| 63 || June 20 || Cubs || 10–3 || Fernandez (8–2) || Sanderson (3–5) || || 44,817 || Shea Stadium ||45–18|| Boxscore || 1 || +10 || 7:35 PM EDT || WOR-TV || || ||
|-  style="text-align:center; background:#fbb;"
| 64 || June 21 || Cubs || 6–8 || Fontenot (3–2) || Orosco (3–3) || || 42,566 || Shea Stadium ||45–19|| Boxscore || 1 || +10 || 1:35 PM EDT || || SportsChannel New York || ||
|-  style="text-align:center; background:#bfb;"
| 65 || June 22 || Cubs || 4–2 || Darling (8–2) || Sutcliffe (4–9) || || 46,279 || Shea Stadium ||46–19|| Boxscore || 1 || +10 || 1:35 PM EDT || WOR-TV || || ||
|-  style="text-align:center; background:#fbb;"
| 66 || June 23 || Expos || 4–5 (10) || Burke (5–2) || Orosco (3–4)|| || 44,199 || Shea Stadium ||46–20|| Boxscore || 1 || +9 || 7:35 PM EDT || || SportsChannel New York || ||
|-  style="text-align:center; background:#fbb;"
| 67 || June 24 || Expos || 2–6 || Smith (5–5) || Berenyi (2–2)|| McClure (2) || 40,092 || Shea Stadium ||46–21|| Boxscore || 1 || +8 || 7:35 PM EDT || WOR-TV || || ||
|-  style="text-align:center; background:#bfb;"
| 68 || June 25 || Expos || 5–2 || Fernandez (9–2) || McGaffigan (5–3)|| McDowell (6) || 33,030 || Shea Stadium ||47–21|| Boxscore || 1 || +9 || 1:35 PM EDT || WOR-TV || || ||
|-  style="text-align:center; background:#bbb;"
| || June 27 || @ Cubs || colspan=5|Postponed (rain); rescheduled for August 6 || Wrigley Field || || || || bgcolor="bbffbb" | + || || || || ||
|-  style="text-align:center; background:#bfb;"
| 69 || June 28 || @ Cubs || 5–2 || McDowell (7–0) || Fontenot (3–3)|| || 35,152 || Wrigley Field ||48–21|| Boxscore || 1 || + || 3:20 PM EDT || || || NBC ||
|-  style="text-align:center; background:#bfb;"
| 70 || June 29 || @ Cubs || 7–4 || Gooden (9–3) || Sutcliffe (4–10)|| || 34,222 || Wrigley Field ||49–21|| Boxscore || 1 || + || 2:20 PM EDT || WOR-TV || || ||
|-  style="text-align:center; background:#bfb;"
| 71 || June 30 || @ Cardinals || 7–0 || Ojeda (9–2) || Tudor (6–4)|| || 38,819 || Busch Memorial Stadium ||50–21|| Boxscore || 1 || + || 8:05 PM EDT || || || ABC ||
|-

|-  style="text-align:center; background:#bfb;"
| 72 || July 1 || @ Cardinals || 2–1 || Fernandez (10–2) || Cox (2–6)|| McDowell (7) || 25,869 || Busch Memorial Stadium ||51–21|| Boxscore || 1 || + || 8:35 PM EDT || WOR-TV || || ||
|-  style="text-align:center; background:#bfb;"
| 73 || July 2 || @ Cardinals || 4–3 || Sisk (2–1) || Forsch (6–5)|| Orosco (12) || 29,794 || Busch Memorial Stadium ||52–21|| Boxscore || 1 || + || 8:35 PM EDT || WOR-TV || || ||
|-  style="text-align:center; background:#bfb;"
| 74 || July 3 || Astros || 6–5 (10) || Orosco (4–4) || DiPino (1–4)||  || 48,839 || Shea Stadium ||53–21|| Boxscore || 1 || + || 7:35 PM EDT || WOR-TV || || ||
|-  style="text-align:center; background:#bfb;"
| 75 || July 4 || Astros || 2–1 || Gooden (10–3) || Smith (1–5)||  || 28,557 || Shea Stadium ||54–21|| Boxscore || 1 || + || 1:35 PM EDT || || SportsChannel New York || ||
|-  style="text-align:center; background:#fbb;"
| 76 || July 5 || Astros || 1–2 || Kerfeld (6–1) || McDowell (7–1)||  || 50,939 || Shea Stadium ||54–22|| Boxscore || 1 || + || 7:05 PM EDT || || SportsChannel New York || ||
|-  style="text-align:center; background:#bfb;"
| 77 || July 6 || Astros || 5–3 || Fernandez (11–2) || Knudson (0–3)|| McDowell (8)  || 31,017 || Shea Stadium ||55–22|| Boxscore || 1 || + || 1:35 PM EDT || WOR-TV || || ||
|-  style="text-align:center; background:#fbb;"
| 78 || July 7 || Reds || 6–7 || Robinson (7–0) || Niemann (1–3)|| Franco (13) || 29,265 || Shea Stadium ||55–23|| Boxscore || 1|| + || 7:35 PM EDT || || SportsChannel New York || ||
|-  style="text-align:center; background:#fbb;"
| 79 || July 8 || Reds || 4–5 (10) || Franco (3–4) || McDowell (7–2)|| || 35,803 || Shea Stadium ||55–24|| Boxscore || 1 || + || 7:35 PM EDT || || SportsChannel New York || ||
|-  style="text-align:center; background:#fbb;"
| 80 || July 9 || Reds || 1–11 || Browning (7–7) || Gooden (10–4)|| || 38,079 || Shea Stadium ||55–25|| Boxscore || 1 || + || 1:35 PM EDT || WOR-TV || || ||
|-  style="text-align:center; background:#bfb;"
| 81 || July 10 || Braves || 5–1 || Ojeda (10–2) || Smith (7–10)|| || 34,836 || Shea Stadium ||56–25|| Boxscore || 1 || + || 7:35 PM EDT || WOR-TV || || ||
|-  style="text-align:center; background:#bfb;"
| 82 || July 11 || Braves || 11–0 || Fernandez (12–2) || Palmer (5–8)|| || 39,924 || Shea Stadium ||57–25|| Boxscore || 1 || + || 8:35 PM EDT || || || NBC ||
|-  style="text-align:center; background:#bfb;"
| 83 || July 12 || Braves || 10–1 || Aguilera (2–3) || Mahler (10–8)|| || 30,899 || Shea Stadium ||58–25|| Boxscore || 1 || + || 1:50 PM EDT || || || NBC ||
|-  style="text-align:center; background:#bfb;"
| 84 || July 13 || Braves || 2–0 || Darling (9–2) || Alexander (6–5)|| || 41,128 || Shea Stadium ||59–25|| Boxscore || 1 || + || 1:35 PM EDT || WOR-TV || || ||
|- align="center" bgcolor="bbcaff"
|colspan="3" bgcolor="#bbcaff"| July 15: All-Star Game (AL wins—) || 3–2 || Clemens (BOS) || Gooden (NYM) || Aase (BAL) || 45,774 || Astrodome || colspan=9|  Houston, Texas
|-  style="text-align:center; background:#bfb;"
| 85 || July 17 || @ Astros || 13–2 || Ojeda (11–2) || Ryan (6–7)|| || 21,536 || Astrodome ||60–25|| Boxscore || 1 || + || 8:35 PM EDT || WOR-TV || || ||
|-  style="text-align:center; background:#fbb;"
| 86 || July 18 || @ Astros || 0–3 || Knepper (11–7) || Darling (9–3)|| || 22,906 || Astrodome ||60–26|| Boxscore || 1 || + || 8:35 PM EDT || WOR-TV || || ||
|-  style="text-align:center; background:#fbb;"
| 87 || July 19 || @ Astros || 4–5 || Smith (2–6) || McDowell (7–3)|| || 44,502 || Astrodome ||60–27|| Boxscore || 1 || + || 8:35 PM EDT || || SportsChannel New York || ||
|-  style="text-align:center; background:#fbb;"
| 88 || July 20 || @ Astros || 8–9 (15) || Knepper (12–7)|| McDowell (7–4)|| || 23,900 || Astrodome ||60–28|| Boxscore || 1 || +12 || 3:05 PM EDT || WOR-TV || || ||
|-  style="text-align:center; background:#bfb;"
| 89 || July 21 || @ Reds || 4–2 || Aguilera (3–3)|| Soto (3–8)|| Orosco (13) || 23,827 || Riverfront Stadium ||61–28|| Boxscore || 1 || +13 || 8:05 PM EDT || || || ABC ||
|-  style="text-align:center; background:#bfb;"
| 90 || July 22 || @ Reds || 6–3 (14) || McDowell (8–4)|| Willis (1–1)|| || 23,707 || Riverfront Stadium ||62–28|| Boxscore || 1 || +14 || 7:35 PM EDT || WOR-TV || || ||
|-  style="text-align:center; background:#bfb;"
| 91 || July 23 || @ Reds || 3–2 || Darling (10–3)|| Robinson (7–1)|| McDowell (9)|| 25,496 || Riverfront Stadium ||63–28|| Boxscore || 1 || +15 || 7:35 PM EDT || WOR-TV || || ||
|-  style="text-align:center; background:#bbb;"
| || July 25 || @ Braves || colspan=5|Postponed (rain); rescheduled for July 26 || Atlanta–Fulton County Stadium || || || || bgcolor="bbffbb" | +15 || || || || ||
|-  style="text-align:center; background:#fbb;"
| 92 || July 26 || @ Braves || 3–4 || Assenmacher (4–2)|| McDowell (8–5)|| || N/A || Atlanta–Fulton County Stadium ||63–29|| Boxscore || 1 || + || 5:40 PM EDT || || SportsChannel New York || ||
|-  style="text-align:center; background:#fbb;"
| 93 || July 26 || @ Braves || 5–8 || Acker (3–4)|| Fernandez (12–3)|| Garber (12) || 44,400 || Atlanta–Fulton County Stadium ||63–30|| Boxscore || 1 || + || 8:46 PM EDT || || SportsChannel New York || ||
|-  style="text-align:center; background:#bfb;"
| 94 || July 27 || @ Braves || 5–1 || Aguilera (4–3)|| Mahler (10–10)|| || 33,338 || Atlanta–Fulton County Stadium ||64–30|| Boxscore || 1 || + || 2:10 PM EDT || WOR-TV || || ||
|-  style="text-align:center; background:#bfb;"
| 95 || July 28 || Cubs || 9–2 || Ojeda (12–2)|| Sanderson (5–7)|| McDowell (10) || 38,890 || Shea Stadium ||65–30|| Boxscore || 1 || + || 7:35 PM EDT || || SportsChannel New York || ||
|-  style="text-align:center; background:#bfb;"
| 96 || July 29 || Cubs || 3–0 || Darling (11–3)|| Trout (4–4)|| || N/A || Shea Stadium ||66–30|| Boxscore || 1 || + || 5:35 PM EDT || || SportsChannel New York || ||
|-  style="text-align:center; background:#fbb;"
| 97 || July 29 || Cubs || 1–2 || Moyer (11–3)|| Sisk (2–2)|| Smith (18) || 45,731 || Shea Stadium ||66–31|| Boxscore || 1 || + || 8:21 PM EDT || || SportsChannel New York || ||
|-  style="text-align:center; background:#fbb;"
| 98 || July 30 || Cubs || 3–4 || Eckersley (5–6)|| Fernandez (12–4)|| Smith (19) || 35,734 || Shea Stadium ||66–32|| Boxscore || 1 || + || 7:35 PM EDT || WOR-TV || || ||
|-

|-  style="text-align:center; background:#bfb;"
| 99 || August 1 || Expos || 3–1 || Gooden (11–4)|| Youmans (10–7)|| McDowell (11) || 47,883 || Shea Stadium ||67–32|| Boxscore || 1 || + || 7:35 PM EDT || WOR-TV || || ||
|-  style="text-align:center; background:#bfb;"
| 100 || August 2 || Expos || 4–1 || Aguilera (5–3) || Sebra (1–2)|| Orosco (14) || 43,069 || Shea Stadium ||68–32|| Boxscore || 1 || + || 7:05 PM EDT || || SportsChannel New York || ||
|-  style="text-align:center; background:#bfb;"
| 101 || August 3 || Expos || 4–3 (10) || McDowell (9–5) || McClure (2–3)|| || 47,167 || Shea Stadium ||69–32|| Boxscore || 1 || + || 1:35 PM EDT || WOR-TV || || ||
|-  style="text-align:center; background:#fbb;"
| 102 || August 4 || @ Cubs || 2–4 || Eckersley (6–6) || Darling (11–4)|| Smith (20) || 29,016 || Wrigley Field ||69–33|| Boxscore || 1 || + || 4:05 PM EDT || || SportsChannel New York || ||
|-  style="text-align:center; background:#fbb;"
| 103 || August 5 || @ Cubs || 5–8 || Smith (7–7) || McDowell (9–6)|| || 28,211 || Wrigley Field ||69–34|| Boxscore || 1 || + || 4:05 PM EDT || || SportsChannel New York || ||
|-  style="text-align:center; background:#bfb;"
| 104 || August 6 || @ Cubs || 7–6 (12) || McDowell (10–6) || Frazier (2–4)|| || N/A || Wrigley Field ||70–34|| Boxscore || 1 || +17 || 1:05 PM EDT || WOR-TV || || ||
|-  style="text-align:center; background:#bfb;"
| 105 || August 6 || @ Cubs || 7–6 || Anderson (1–0) || Trout (4–5)|| Orosco (15) || 33,343 || Wrigley Field ||71–34|| Boxscore || 1 || +17 || 5:37 PM EDT || || SportsChannel New York Plus || ||
|-  style="text-align:center; background:#bfb;"
| 106 || August 7 || @ Cubs || 12–3 || Aguilera (6–3) || Sanderson (5–9)|| || 28,725 || Wrigley Field ||72–34|| Boxscore || 1 || +17 || 2:20 PM EDT || WOR-TV || || ||
|-  style="text-align:center; background:#fbb;"
| 107 || August 8 || @ Expos || 3–5 || Smith (8–6) || Ojeda (12–3)|| Reardon (26) || 21,027 || Olympic Stadium ||72–35|| Boxscore || 1 || +16 || 7:35 PM EDT || WOR-TV || || ||
|-  style="text-align:center; background:#bfb;"
| 108 || August 9 || @ Expos || 10–8 || McDowell (11–6) || Reardon (6–7)|| Orosco (16) || 33,093  || Olympic Stadium ||73–35|| Boxscore || 1 || +17 || 7:35 PM EDT || || SportsChannel New York || ||
|-  style="text-align:center; background:#bfb;"
| 109 || August 10 || @ Expos || 7–2 || Fernandez (13–4) || Martínez (1–4)|| Anderson (1) || 35,743 || Olympic Stadium ||74–35|| Boxscore || 1 || +18 || 1:35 PM EDT || WOR-TV || || ||
|-  style="text-align:center; background:#bfb;"
| 110 || August 11 || @ Phillies || 8–4 || Gooden (12–4) || Carman (5–4)|| || 43,133 || Veterans Stadium ||75–35|| Boxscore || 1 || +19 || 8:05 PM EDT || || || ABC ||
|-  style="text-align:center; background:#fbb;"
| 111 || August 12 || @ Phillies || 1–3 || Gross (8–9) || Aguilera (6–4)|| || 36,442 || Veterans Stadium ||75–36|| Boxscore || 1 || +18 || 7:35 PM EDT || || SportsChannel New York || ||
|-  style="text-align:center; background:#fbb;"
| 112 || August 13 || @ Phillies || 4–8 || Ruffin (4–3) || Ojeda (12–4)|| || 39,041 || Veterans Stadium ||75–37|| Boxscore || 1 || +18 || 7:35 PM EDT || WOR-TV || || ||
|-  style="text-align:center; background:#bfb;"
| 113 || August 14 || Cardinals || 4–3 || McDowell (12–6) || Worrell (7–9)|| || N/A || Shea Stadium ||76–37|| Boxscore || 1 || + || 5:35 PM EDT || || SportsChannel New York || ||
|-  style="text-align:center; background:#fbb;"
| 114 || August 14 || Cardinals || 1–5 || Horton (2–3) || Anderson (1–1)|| || 48,949 || Shea Stadium ||76–38|| Boxscore || 1 || + || 8:56 PM EDT || || SportsChannel New York || ||
|-  style="text-align:center; background:#fbb;"
| 115 || August 15 || Cardinals || 2–4 (10) || Perry (2–2) || Orosco (4–5)|| Worrell (26) || 46,780 || Shea Stadium ||76–39|| Boxscore || 1 || +16 || 7:35 PM EDT || WOR-TV || || ||
|-  style="text-align:center; background:#fbb;"
| 116 || August 16 || Cardinals || 1–3 (11) || Mathews (9–3) || McDowell (12–7)|| Worrell (27) || 44,873 || Shea Stadium ||76–40|| Boxscore || 1 || +16 || 2:20 PM EDT || || || NBC ||
|-  style="text-align:center; background:#fbb;"
| 117 || August 17 || Cardinals || 1–2 || Tudor (12–6) || Aguilera (6–5)|| Perry (2) || N/A || Shea Stadium ||76–41|| Boxscore || 1 || + || 1:05 PM EDT || WOR-TV || || ||
|-  style="text-align:center; background:#bfb;"
| 118 || August 17 || Cardinals || 9–2 || Niemann (2–3) || Cox (7–10)|| McDowell (12) || 44,843 || Shea Stadium ||77–41|| Boxscore || 1 || + || 4:32 PM EDT || WOR-TV || || ||
|-  style="text-align:center; background:#bfb;"
| 119 || August 18 || @ Dodgers || 5–4 || Ojeda (13–4) || Hershiser (12–9)|| McDowell (13) || 46,099 || Dodger Stadium ||78–41|| Boxscore || 1 || +17 || 8:05 PM EDT || || || ABC ||
|-  style="text-align:center; background:#bfb;"
| 120 || August 19 || @ Dodgers || 6–4 || Darling (12–4) || Valenzuela (15–9)|| McDowell (14) || 46,977 || Dodger Stadium ||79–41|| Boxscore || 1 || +18 || 10:35 PM EDT || WOR-TV || || ||
|-  style="text-align:center; background:#bfb;"
| 121 || August 20 || @ Dodgers || 7–5 || Fernandez (14–4) || Powell (2–5)|| Orosco (17) || 36,738 || Dodger Stadium ||80–41|| Boxscore || 1 || + || 8:20 PM EDT || || || NBC ||
|-  style="text-align:center; background:#bfb;"
| 122 || August 22 || @ Giants || 5–3 || Gooden (13–4) || Blue (9–8)|| McDowell (15) || 30,679 || Candlestick Park ||81–41|| Boxscore || 1 || +19 || 11:05 PM EDT || || SportsChannel New York || ||
|-  style="text-align:center; background:#bfb;"
| 123 || August 23 || @ Giants || 3–2 || Ojeda (14–4) || Downs (0–4)|| McDowell (16) || 31,033 || Candlestick Park ||82–41|| Boxscore || 1 || +20 || 4:05 PM EDT || || SportsChannel New York || ||
|-  style="text-align:center; background:#fbb;"
| 124 || August 24 || @ Giants || 1–10 || Krukow (13–7) || Aguilera (6–6)|| || 31,606 || Candlestick Park ||82–42|| Boxscore || 1 || +19 || 4:05 PM EDT || WOR-TV || || ||
|-  style="text-align:center; background:#bfb;"
| 125 || August 25 || @ Padres || 5–2 || Orosco (5–5) || Lefferts (7–5)|| McDowell (17) || 18,605 || Jack Murphy Stadium ||83–42|| Boxscore || 1 || +20 || 8:05 PM EDT || || SportsChannel New York || ||
|-  style="text-align:center; background:#bfb;"
| 126 || August 26 || @ Padres || 11–6 || Fernandez (15–4) || Dravecky (9–11)|| || 15,992 || Jack Murphy Stadium ||84–42|| Boxscore || 1 || +20 || 10:05 PM EDT || WOR-TV || || ||
|-  style="text-align:center; background:#bfb;"
| 127 || August 27 || @ Padres || 6–5 (11) || Sisk (3–2) || Gossage (5–7)|| || 19,747 || Jack Murphy Stadium ||85–42|| Boxscore || 1 || +20 || 10:05 PM EDT || WOR-TV || || ||
|-  style="text-align:center; background:#bfb;"
| 128 || August 29 || Dodgers || 2–1 || Ojeda (15–4) || Honeycutt (9–9)|| || 45,667 || Shea Stadium || 86–42|| Boxscore || 1 || +20 || 7:35 PM EDT || WOR-TV || || ||
|-  style="text-align:center; background:#bfb;"
| 129 || August 30 || Dodgers || 6–3 || Aguilera (7–6) || Hershiser (12–10)|| McDowell (18) || 44,040 || Shea Stadium || 87–42|| Boxscore || 1 || +20 || 2:20 PM EDT || || || NBC ||
|-  style="text-align:center; background:#fbb;"
| 130 || August 31 || Dodgers || 4–7 || Valenzuela  (17–9) || Darling (12–5)|| || 45,678 || Shea Stadium || 87–43|| Boxscore || 1 || +19 || 1:35 PM EDT || WOR-TV || || ||
|-

|-  style="text-align:center; background:#bfb;"
| 131 || September 1 || Giants || 5–2 || McDowell  (13–7) || Davis (4–5)|| || 44,272 || Shea Stadium || 88–43|| Boxscore || 1 || +19 || 1:35 PM EDT || WOR-TV || || ||
|-  style="text-align:center; background:#fbb;"
| 132 || September 2 || Giants || 3–4 || Krukow  (14–8) || Gooden (13–5)|| Garrelts (7) || 26,166 || Shea Stadium || 88–44|| Boxscore || 1 || +19 || 7:35 PM EDT || WOR-TV || || ||
|-  style="text-align:center; background:#bfb;"
| 133 || September 3 || Giants || 4–2 || Ojeda (16–4) || Mulholland (0–6)|| || 25,851 || Shea Stadium || 89–44|| Boxscore || 1 || +20 || 7:35 PM EDT || || SportsChannel New York || ||
|-  style="text-align:center; background:#bbb;"
| || September 5 || Padres || colspan=5|Postponed (rain); rescheduled for September 7 || Shea Stadium || || || || bgcolor="bbffbb" | + || || || || ||
|-  style="text-align:center; background:#bfb;"
| 134 || September 6 || Padres || 4–3 || Orosco (6–5) || McCullers (7–7)|| || 46,879 || Shea Stadium || 90–44|| Boxscore || 1 || + || 2:20 PM EDT || || || NBC ||
|-  style="text-align:center; background:#bfb;"
| 135 || September 7 || Padres || 7–1 || Gooden (14–5) || LaPoint (4–8)|| || N/A || Shea Stadium || 91–44|| Boxscore || 1 || +21 || 1:05 PM EDT || WOR-TV || || ||
|-  style="text-align:center; background:#bfb;"
| 136 || September 7 || Padres || 6–5 || Sisk (4–2) || Lefferts (7–7)|| McDowell (19) || 38,630 || Shea Stadium || 92–44|| Boxscore || 1 || +21 || 3:54 PM EDT || WOR-TV || || ||
|-  style="text-align:center; background:#fbb;"
| 137 || September 8 || Expos || 1–9 || Sebra (4–3) || Ojeda (16–5)|| || 38,630 || Shea Stadium || 92–45|| Boxscore || 1 || +21 || 7:35 PM EDT || || SportsChannel New York || ||
|-  style="text-align:center; background:#fbb;"
| 138 || September 9 || Expos || 7–9 || Burke (9–7) || Orosco (6–6)|| Reardon (31) || 26,867 || Shea Stadium || 92–46|| Boxscore || 1 || +21 || 7:35 PM EDT || WOR-TV || || ||
|-  style="text-align:center; background:#bfb;"
| 139 || September 10 || Expos || 6–1 || Darling (13–5) || Valdez (0–1)|| || 31,934 || Shea Stadium || 93–46|| Boxscore || 1 || +22 || 7:35 PM EDT || || SportsChannel New York || ||
|-  style="text-align:center; background:#fbb;"
| 140 || September 12 || @ Phillies || 3–6 || Ruffin (8–3) || Gooden (14–6)|| Bedrosian (24) || 43,070 || Veterans Stadium || 93–47|| Boxscore || 1 || +21 || 7:35 PM EDT || WOR-TV || || ||
|-  style="text-align:center; background:#fbb;"
| 141 || September 13 || @ Phillies || 5–6 || Schatzeder (4–4) || McDowell (13–8)|| Bedrosian (25) || 47,108 || Veterans Stadium || 93–48|| Boxscore || 1 || +20 || 7:05 PM EDT || || SportsChannel New York || ||
|-  style="text-align:center; background:#fbb;"
| 142 || September 14 || @ Phillies || 0–6 || Gross (10–11) || Fernandez (15–5)|| || 38,652 || Veterans Stadium || 93–49|| Boxscore || 1 || +19 || 1:35 PM EDT || WOR-TV || || ||
|-  style="text-align:center; background:#fbb;"
| 143 || September 15 || @ Cardinals || 0–1 (13) || Worrell (9–10) || McDowell (13–9)|| || 29,566 || Busch Memorial Stadium || 93–50|| Boxscore || 1 || +18 || 8:35 PM EDT || WOR-TV || || ||
|-  style="text-align:center; background:#bfb;"
| 144 || September 16 || @ Cardinals || 4–2 || Aguilera (8–6) || Conroy (4–9)|| Orosco (18) || 30,935 || Busch Memorial Stadium || 94–50|| Boxscore || 1 || +18 || 8:35 PM EDT || WOR-TV || || ||
|-  style="text-align:center; background:#007800;"
| 145 || September 17 || Cubs ||  4–2 || Gooden (15–6) || Eckersley (6–10)||  || 47,823 || Shea Stadium || 95–50|| Boxscore || 1 || +19 || 7:35 PM EDT || WOR-TV || || ||
|-  style="text-align:center; background:#bfb;"
| 146 || September 18 || Cubs || 5–0 || Anderson (2–1) || Maddux (1–3)||  || 13,726 || Shea Stadium || 96–50|| Boxscore || 1 || +19 || 1:35 PM EDT || || SportsChannel New York || ||
|-  style="text-align:center; background:#fbb;"
| 147 || September 19 || Phillies || 3–4 || Gross (11–11) || Fernandez (15–6)|| Bedrosian (27) || 35,023 || Shea Stadium || 96–51|| Boxscore || 1 || +18 || 7:35 PM EDT || WOR-TV || || ||
|-  style="text-align:center; background:#bfb;"
| 148 || September 20 || Phillies || 9–5 || Darling (14–5) || Hume (4–1)||  || 39,104 || Shea Stadium || 97–51|| Boxscore || 1 || +19 || 7:05 PM EDT || || SportsChannel New York || ||
|-  style="text-align:center; background:#fbb;"
| 149 || September 21 || Phillies || 1–7 || Freeman (1–0) || Mitchell (0–1)|| || 42,631 || Shea Stadium || 97–52|| Boxscore || 1 || +18 || 1:35 PM EDT || WOR-TV || || ||
|-  style="text-align:center; background:#bfb;"
| 150 || September 22 || Cardinals || 5–2 || Gooden (16–6) || Forsch (14–9)|| || 25,714 || Shea Stadium || 98–52|| Boxscore || 1 || +19 || 7:35 PM EDT || || SportsChannel New York || ||
|-  style="text-align:center; background:#bfb;"
| 151 || September 23 || Cardinals || 9–1 || Ojeda (17–5) || Mathews (10–8)|| Orosco (19) || 11,203 || Shea Stadium || 99–52|| Boxscore || 1 || +19 || 7:35 PM EDT || WOR-TV || || ||
|-  style="text-align:center; background:#fbb;"
| 152 || September 24 || @ Cubs || 2–8 || Hall (1–1) || Aguilera (8–7)||  || 6,468 || Wrigley Field || 99–53|| Boxscore || 1 || +19 || 2:20 PM EDT || || SportsChannel New York || ||
|-  style="text-align:center; background:#bfb;"
| 153 || September 25 || @ Cubs || 6–5 || McDowell (14–9) || Lynch (5–5)|| Orosco (20) || 8,840 || Wrigley Field || 100–53|| Boxscore || 1 || +20 || 2:20 PM EDT || || SportsChannel New York || ||
|-  style="text-align:center; background:#bfb;"
| 154 || September 26 || @ Pirates || 3–1 || Fernandez (16–6) || Fansler (0–2)|| McDowell (20) || 14,080 || Three Rivers Stadium || 101–53|| Boxscore || 1 || +20 || 7:35 PM EDT || WOR-TV || || ||
|-  style="text-align:center; background:#bfb;"
| 155 || September 27 || @ Pirates || 4–2 (11) || Orosco (7–6) || McWilliams (2–11)|| Sisk (1) || 13,210 || Three Rivers Stadium || 102–53|| Boxscore || 1 || +20 || 7:05 PM EDT || || SportsChannel New York || ||
|-  style="text-align:center; background:#bfb;"
| 156 || September 28 || @ Pirates || 4–1 (11) || Aguilera (9–7) || Walk (7–8) || || 30,606 || Three Rivers Stadium || 103–53|| Boxscore || 1 || +20 || 1:35 PM EDT || WOR-TV || || ||
|-  style="text-align:center; background:#fbb;"
| 157 || September 30 || @ Expos || 0–1 || Sebra (5–5) || Darling (14–6) || || 6,068 || Olympic Stadium || 103–54 || Boxscore || 1 || + || 7:35 PM EDT || WOR-TV || || ||
|-

|-  style="text-align:center; background:#bfb;"
| 158 || October 1 || @ Expos || 6–4  (11) || Orosco (8–6) || McClure (4–6) || McDowell (21) || 10,740 || Olympic Stadium || 104–54 || Boxscore || 1 || +20 || 7:05 PM EDT || || SportsChannel New York || ||
|-  style="text-align:center; background:#bfb;"
| 159 || October 2 || @ Expos || 8–2 || Gooden (17–6) || Youmans (13–12) || || 10,726 || Olympic Stadium || 105–54 || Boxscore || 1 || + || 7:35 PM EDT || WOR-TV || || ||
|-  style="text-align:center; background:#bbb;"
| || October 3 || Pirates || colspan=5|Postponed (rain); rescheduled for October 4 || Shea Stadium || || || || bgcolor="bbffbb" | +21 || || || || ||
|-  style="text-align:center; background:#bfb;"
| 160 || October 4 || Pirates || 8–2 || Ojeda (18–5) || Fansler (0–3) || Orosco (21) || N/A || Shea Stadium ||106–54 || Boxscore || 1 || + || 1:05 PM EDT || || SportsChannel New York || ||
|-  style="text-align:center; background:#bfb;"
| 161 || October 4 || Pirates || 5–2 || Aguilera (10–7) || Patterson (2–3) || McDowell (22) || 30,810 || Shea Stadium || 107–54 || Boxscore || 1 || + || 3:52 PM EDT || || SportsChannel New York || ||
|-  style="text-align:center; background:#bfb;"
| 162 || October 5 || Pirates || 9–0 || Darling (15–6) || Pena (0–3) || Fernandez (1) || 32,170 || Shea Stadium || 108–54 || Boxscore || 1 || + || 1:35 PM EDT || WOR-TV || || ||
|-

All times are EASTERN time

Postseason

|-  style="text-align:center; background:#fbb;"
| 1 || October 8 || @ Astros || 0–1 || Scott (1–0) || Gooden (0–1) || || 44,131 || Astrodome || Boxscore || 8:25 PM EDT || ABC || CBS
|-  style="text-align:center; background:#bfb;"
| 2 || October 9 || @ Astros || 5–1 || Ojeda (1–0) || Ryan (0–1) || || 44,391 || Astrodome || Boxscore || 8:20 PM EDT || ABC || CBS
|-  style="text-align:center; background:#bfb;"
| 3 || October 11 || Astros || 6–5 || Orosco (1–0) || Smith (0–1) || || 55,052 || Shea Stadium || Boxscore || 12:10 PM EDT || ABC || CBS
|-  style="text-align:center; background:#fbb;"
| 4 || October 12 || Astros || 1–3 || Scott (2–0) || Fernandez (0–1) || || 55,038 || Shea Stadium || Boxscore || 8:20 PM EDT || ABC || CBS
|-  style="text-align:center; background:#bfb;"
| 5 || October 14 || Astros || 2–1 (12) || Orosco (2–0) || Kerfeld (0–1) || || 54,986 || Shea Stadium || Boxscore || 1:10 PM EDT || ABC || CBS
|-  style="text-align:center; background:#bfb;"
| 6 || October 15 || @ Astros || 7–6 (16) || Orosco (3–0) || López (0–1) || || 45,718 || Astrodome || Boxscore || 3:05 PM EDT || ABC || CBS
|-

|-  style="text-align:center; background:#fbb;"
| 1 || October 18 || Red Sox || 0–1 || Hurst (1–0) || Darling (0–1) || Schiraldi (1) || 57,908 || Shea Stadium || Boxscore || 8:30 PM EDT || NBC || CBS
|-  style="text-align:center; background:#fbb;"
| 2 || October 19 || Red Sox || 3–9 || Crawford (1–0) || Gooden (0–1) || Stanley (1) || 57,911 || Shea Stadium || Boxscore || 8:25 PM EDT || NBC || CBS
|-  style="text-align:center; background:#bfb;"
| 3 || October 21 || @ Red Sox || 7–1 || Ojeda (1–0) || Boyd (0–1) || || 33,595 || Fenway Park || Boxscore || 8:30 PM EDT || NBC || CBS
|-  style="text-align:center; background:#bfb;"
| 4 || October 22 || @ Red Sox || 6–2 || Darling (1–1) || Nipper (0–1) || Orosco (1) || 33,920 || Fenway Park || Boxscore || 8:25 PM EDT || NBC || CBS
|-  style="text-align:center; background:#fbb;"
| 5 || October 23 || @ Red Sox || 2–4 || Hurst (2–0) || Gooden (0–2) || || 34,010 || Fenway Park || Boxscore || 8:35 PM EDT || NBC || CBS
|-  style="text-align:center; background:#bfb;"
| 6 || October 25 || Red Sox || 6–5 (10) || Aguilera (1–0) || Schiraldi (0–1) || || 57,908 || Shea Stadium || Boxscore || 8:25 PM EDT || NBC || CBS
|-  style="text-align:center; background:#bfb;"
| 7 || October 27 || Red Sox || 8–5 || McDowell (1–0) || Schiraldi (0–2) || Orosco (2) || 55,032 || Shea Stadium || Boxscore || 8:10 PM EST || NBC || CBS
|-

All times are EASTERN time
All games broadcast on WHN and METS RADIO NETWORK
Some 1986 New York Mets Cable TV broadcasts were carried on SportsChannel New York Plus because of broadcast conflict of (NY Yankees) of (MLB), (New Jersey) of (NBA) and (NY Islanders) of (NHL).

 Attendance 

 Opening day lineup 

Roster

Player stats

Batting

Starters by position
Note: Pos = Position; G = Games played; AB = At bats; H = Hits; Avg. = Batting average; HR = Home runs; RBI = Runs batted in

Other batters
Note: G = Games played; AB = At bats; H = Hits; Avg. = Batting average; HR = Home runs; RBI = Runs batted in; SB = Stolen bases

Pitching

Starting pitchers
Note: G = Games pitched; IP = Innings pitched; W = Wins; L = Losses; ERA = Earned run average; SO = Strikeouts

Other pitchers
Note: G = Games pitched; IP = Innings pitched; W = Wins; L = Losses; ERA = Earned run average; SO = Strikeouts

Relief pitchers
Note: G = Games pitched; IP = Innings pitched; W = Wins; L = Losses; ERA = Earned run average; SO = Strikeouts; SV = Saves

NLCS

Game 1
October 8 (Astrodome, Houston)

Game 2
October 9 (Astrodome, Houston)

Game 3
October 11 (Shea Stadium, Flushing, New York)

Game 4
October 12 (Shea Stadium, Flushing, New York)

Game 5
October 14 (Shea Stadium, Flushing, New York)

Game 6
October 15 (Astrodome, Houston)

World SeriesNL New York Mets (4) vs. AL Boston Red Sox (3)Game Six

One of the most famous games in baseball history is Game 6 of the 1986 World Series. The Mets rallied in the bottom of the 8th inning of Game 6, tying the game on a Gary Carter sacrifice fly. Reliever Calvin Schiraldi had loaded the bases with one out and had a 3–0 count on Carter, who swung away at the next pitch to hit the fly ball. In the ninth inning, after a walk and an error put two men on with nobody out, Howard Johnson was sent to the plate to sacrifice the winning run to third. After Johnson was unsuccessful on his first bunt attempt, Mets manager Davey Johnson took the bunt off. Johnson ended up striking out, leaving runners at first and second with one out. Lee Mazzilli followed with a deep fly to left that would have won the game had the runner been at third. Lenny Dykstra then flied out for the third out, sending the game to extra innings.

In the top of the 10th inning, Dave Henderson homered to pull the Sox within three outs of a world championship, and Barrett singled in Wade Boggs to make it a 5–3 lead. When Wally Backman and Keith Hernandez were retired to start the bottom of the 10th, the championship seemed at hand.  After Hernandez made the second out, he went to the Mets' locker room, took off his uniform, opened a beer and watched the rest of the game on the clubhouse TV, thinking the game and the Series would be over soon.  Hernandez, who is superstitious, never left that spot until the game ended. 

Then, Carter singled to left. Pinch-hitter Kevin Mitchell then singled to center and Shea Stadium started to get loud. Knight went down in the count 0–2 bringing the Mets to their last strike but he hit the next pitch into center field for a single that scored Carter and advanced Mitchell to third base, making the score 5–4 and bringing Shea back to life.  Before his at-bat, Mitchell was on the phone in the locker room making plane reservations to fly home to San Diego, thinking the game was over.  He had already gotten out of his uniform and was in street clothes, and, when he was told he was batting, got off the phone and hurriedly got dressed, not even bothering to put his cup back on.

The Red Sox replaced Schiraldi with Bob Stanley to face left fielder Mookie Wilson. Wilson got the count to 2–1 but fouled the fourth pitch away to bring the Mets to their last strike again. He stayed alive fouling off two more Stanley pitches. Then, the seventh pitch sailed towards Wilson's knees sending him to the ground.  the ball bounced off catcher Rich Gedman's catchers' mitt and went straight to the backstop. Mitchell scored on the wild pitch (which many thought should have been scored a passed ball) uncontested to tie the game and Shea Stadium erupted while Knight advanced to second base. The Red Sox were shocked to have blown the lead with the game all but over, much as the Angels had done to them in the ALCS almost two weeks earlier.

Wilson fouled off two more pitches to bring the at bat to the tenth pitch. His next hit sent a slow rolling ground ball up the first base line, which appeared to be an easy to field situation. Bill Buckner, with his chronic bad ankles and knees, moved to field the ball in an effort to beat the speedy Wilson to first base, and finish the inning. As he bent over, the ball passed between his legs, under his glove and rolled behind him into right field. Shea Stadium exploded and the Mets' players and fans screamed in excitement. Knight needed to hold his helmet on while jumping towards home plate with the winning run. Buckner and the rest of the Red Sox appeared stunned as they exited the field.

Vin Scully's call of the play quickly become an iconic one to baseball fans, with the normally calm Scully growing increasingly excited:

Scully then remained silent for more than three minutes, letting the pictures and the crowd noise tell the story. Scully resumed with: 

Had the Red Sox won the World Series, they would have won their first World Series since 1918, in addition to making Boston the first city to win both NBA and World Series championships in the same year. As it turned out, the Celtics championship four months before was the last championship for Boston and for Massachusetts until the New England Patriots, who lost Super Bowl XX to the Chicago Bears in January, won Super Bowl XXXVI in 2002.

Awards and honors

 Ray Knight, Babe Ruth Award
 Ray Knight, World Series Most Valuable Player Award
 Keith Hernandez, National League First Baseman Gold Glove
 Gary Carter, National League Catcher Silver Slugger Award

57th Major League Baseball All-Star GameInfieldersOutfieldersCatcherPitchersCoach'Farm system

LEAGUE CHAMPIONS: Columbia

Documentary
ESPN 30 for 30 released a four-part documentary on the 1986 Mets entitled Once Upon a Time in Queens'', in September 2021. It is produced by Jimmy Kimmel and directed by Nick Davis. It is available for streaming on ESPN+ along with the entire 30 for 30 library.

Notes

References

External links

1986 New York Mets at Baseball Almanac
1986 New York Mets at Baseball Reference
1986 New York Mets schedule and stats at MLB.com
The 1986 New York Mets at Retrosheet
1986 Mets: The ballad of Doc and Darryl at ESPN.com

New York Mets season
National League champion seasons
National League East champion seasons
New York Mets seasons
World Series champion seasons
New York
1980s in Queens